Mobile number portability (MNP) enables mobile telephone users to retain their mobile telephone numbers when changing from one mobile network carrier to another.

General overview

Mobile number portability is implemented in varying ways across the globe. The International and European standard specifies that a customer wishing to port their number contact the new network (recipient), which then sends the number portability request (NPR) to the current network (donor). This is known as "recipient-led" porting. By contrast, the UK and India are the only exceptions to implement a "donor-led" system. In the case of a donor-led system, the customer wishing to port their number is required to contact the donor to obtain a Porting Authorisation Code (PAC) in the UK— or a Unique Porting Code (UPC) in India —which is then given to the recipient network. The recipient continues the porting process by contacting the donor with a porting code. This form of porting is known as "donor-led" and has been criticised by some industry analysts as being inefficient, though it prevents MNP scams. It has also been observed that it may act as customer deterrent as well as allowing the donor an opportunity of "winning back" the customer. This might lead to distortion of competition, especially in the markets with new entrants that are yet to achieve scalability of operation. From 1 July 2019 as a result of new rules from Ofcom, In the UK a customer can request a PAC without having to speak to their provider by texting PAC to 65075.

Technical details

A significant technical aspect of MNP is related to the routing of calls or mobile messages (SMS, MMS) to a number once it has been ported. There are various flavours of call routing implementation across the globe but the International and European best practice is via the use of a central database (CDB) of ported numbers. A network operator makes copies of the CDB and queries it to find out to which network to send a call. According to RFC3482, this is also known as All Call Query (ACQ) and is highly efficient and scalable. A majority of the established and upcoming MNP systems across the world are based on this ACQ/CDB method of call routing. One of the very few countries not to use ACQ/CDB is the UK, where once a number has been ported, calls to that number are still routed via the donor network. This is also known as "indirect routing" and is highly inefficient as it is wasteful of transmission and switching capacity. Because of its donor dependent nature, indirect routing also means that if the donor network develops a fault or goes out of business, the customers who have ported numbers out of that network will lose incoming calls to their numbers. The UK telecoms regulator Ofcom completed its extended review of the UK MNP process on 29 November 2007, and mandated that ACQ/CDB be implemented for mobile to mobile ported calls by no later than 1 September 2009.

Prior to March 2008, it took a minimum of 5 working days to port a number in the UK, compared to 3.5 working days in Pakistan, 2 hours in United States, as quickly as 20 minutes in the Republic of Ireland, 3 minutes in Australia, and a matter of seconds in New Zealand. On 17 July 2007, Ofcom released its conclusions from the review of the UK MNP and mandated reduction of porting time to 2 working days effective 1 April 2008. On 29 November 2007, Ofcom completed a round of consultations on further reduction of porting time to 2 hours along with recipient-led porting and mandated that near-instant (no more than 2 hours) recipient-led porting be implemented by no later than 1 September 2009. However, in early 2008 Vodafone UK appealed the Ofcom statement before the Competition Appeal Tribunal (CAT), and on 18 September 2008, CAT ruled in favor of the appeal, returning the matter back to Ofcom for reconsideration. On 8 July 2010, Ofcom issued a final statement, retaining the donor-led process, mandating a two-hour PAC release time, and reducing the porting time from two to one working day.

In a decentralised model of MNP, an FNR (flexible number register) may be used to manage a database of ported out/ported in numbers for call routing.

Number lookup services
Service providers and carriers who route messages and voice calls to MNP-enabled countries might use home location register (HLR) query services to find out the correct network of a mobile phone number. A number of such services exist, which query the operator's HLR over the SS7 signalling network in order to determine the current network of a specified mobile phone number prior to attempted routing of messaging or voice traffic. These number lookup services can access the centralized database where the details related to each phone number subscribe is present who has been authorised to use the GSM network.

Impact of MNP on mobile carriers and customers

MNP is important for the telecom markets because it removes a hurdle to switching that might keep those with much equity in the number— in particular business users —prisoner behind a high switching barrier. The reduction in barriers to switching is of particular benefit to challenger carriers against dominant incumbents. Typically, when MNP is implemented in a country, a rise in churn follows.

The caller/customer experience of portability can vary by country. For example, in Portugal any call to a ported mobile number includes an announcement that the number has been ported. Uptake of porting varies considerably by market: A report by Irish regulator Comreg shows over 3 million Irish mobile numbers ported between 2004 and 2013, whereas in Portugal, with a much larger population of mobile users, only a little over one million numbers ported in a similar period.

The Americas

Central Asia

Asia Pacific

Europe

Middle East and Africa

See also
Local number portability
Porting Authorisation Code

References

Mobile telecommunications standards